Amelia Antonia Josepha Hinten (26 August 1942 – 26 April 2021) was a Dutch athlete. She competed at the 1964 Summer Olympics in the pentathlon and finished in 14th place. After marrying W. Louer on 22 April 1966 she changed her name to Lia Louer and won a silver medal in the 400 m at the 1967 European Indoor Games.

References 

1942 births
2021 deaths
Athletes (track and field) at the 1964 Summer Olympics
Dutch female hurdlers
Dutch pentathletes
Dutch female sprinters
Olympic athletes of the Netherlands
Sportspeople from Tilburg
20th-century Dutch women
21st-century Dutch women